Krasnaya Sloboda is a rural locality in Platavsky Selsoviet Rural Settlement, Konyshyovsky District, Kursk Oblast, Russia. Population:

Geography 
The village is located on the Suzhavitsa River (a left tributary of the Svapa River), 49 km from the Russia–Ukraine border, 72 km north-west of Kursk, 9.5 km west of the district center – the urban-type settlement Konyshyovka, 4 km from the selsoviet center – Kashara.

 Climate
Krasnaya Sloboda has a warm-summer humid continental climate (Dfb in the Köppen climate classification).

Transport 
Krasnaya Sloboda is located 46 km from the federal route  Ukraine Highway, 53 km from the route  Crimea Highway, 34 km from the route  (Trosna – M3 highway), 25 km from the road of regional importance  (Fatezh – Dmitriyev), 9.5 km from the road  (Konyshyovka – Zhigayevo – 38K-038), 22.5 km from the road  (Kursk – Lgov – Rylsk – border with Ukraine), 7 km from the road  (Lgov – Konyshyovka), 2 km from the road of intermunicipal significance  (Konyshyovka – Makaro-Petrovskoye, with the access road to the villages of Belyayevo and Chernicheno), on the road  (38N-144 – Shustovo – Korobkino), 9.5 km from the nearest railway station Konyshyovka (railway line Navlya – Lgov-Kiyevsky).

The rural locality is situated 79 km from Kursk Vostochny Airport, 165 km from Belgorod International Airport and 282 km from Voronezh Peter the Great Airport.

References

Notes

Sources

Rural localities in Konyshyovsky District